This is a list of stops for the Boardwalk Hall Auditorium Organ, the largest pipe organ in the world as measured by number of pipes. The organ is located in the main auditorium of Boardwalk Hall in Atlantic City, New Jersey. The organ was built by the Midmer-Losh Organ Company between 1929 and 1932.

Speaking stops
Most of the speaking stops are assigned to one of the seven manuals or to the pedals. The remainder are "floating" stops that can be assigned to one or more manuals. The stops are grouped into "divisions", with each division providing a different collection of sounds. The "pitch" of the stop indicates the nominal length of the pipe that sounds when the key for C two octaves below middle C is pressed.

References 
 
 
 

Music of New Jersey

Culture of Atlantic City, New Jersey
Auditorium Organ Stoplist